George Shoesmith (19 October 1842 – 27 July 1877) was an English cricketer. Shoesmith was a left-handed batsman who bowled right-arm roundarm fast.  He was born at Storrington, Sussex.

Shoemsith made his first-class debut for Sussex against Surrey in 1869 at The Oval, with him making four further first-class appearances in that season. The following season he made just a single first-class appearance against Kent, before making five further first-class appearances in 1871, the last of which came against Surrey. Playing as a bowler, Shoesmith took 20 wickets at an average of 23.35, with best figures of 5/48. This was his only first-class five wicket haul and came against the Marylebone Cricket Club in 1871. As a tailend batsman, Shoesmith scored 91 runs at a batting average of 7.00, and a high score of 17 not out.

Besides playing, Shoesmith also stood as an umpire in two first-class matches, one in 1873 in the Gentlemen v Players fixture and in 1875 between the Gentlemen of the South and the Players of the North. He died at Sutton, Sussex on 27 July 1877.

References

External links
George Shoesmith at ESPNcricinfo
George Shoesmith at CricketArchive

1842 births
1877 deaths
People from Storrington
English cricketers
Sussex cricketers
English cricket umpires